Poa ensiformis, commonly known as sword tussock-grass or purple-sheathed tussock-grass, is a species of tussock grass that is endemic to Australia.

The species was formally described in 1970 by Australian botanist Joyce Winifred Vickery based on plant material collected to the north of Kiandra in New South Wales.

References

ensiformis
Flora of New South Wales
Flora of Victoria (Australia)